Ivan Kokonov (born 17 August 1991) is a Bulgarian professional footballer who plays as a winger for Arda Kardzhali.

Career
Born in Petrich, Kokonov started his career in his hometown with Belasitsa Petrich. Then he played for Pirin Blagoevgrad, before joining Vekta Plovdiv as a youth player.

He made his professional debut for Sliven 2000, during 2009–10 season, on 13 April 2010 in a 0–2 away loss against Chernomorets Burgas, coming on as a substitute for Nikolay Dimitrov.

On 12 September 2017, Kokonov signed with Montana until the end of the season.

On 11 June 2018, Kokonov joined Dunav Ruse.

Honours

Club
Cherno More
 Bulgarian Cup: 2014–15

References

External links

1991 births
Living people
People from Petrich
Bulgarian footballers
Association football wingers
OFC Sliven 2000 players
PFC Slavia Sofia players
FC Botev Vratsa players
PFC Cherno More Varna players
PFC Beroe Stara Zagora players
FC Montana players
FC Dunav Ruse players
FC Arda Kardzhali players
First Professional Football League (Bulgaria) players
Second Professional Football League (Bulgaria) players
Sportspeople from Blagoevgrad Province
21st-century Bulgarian people